Federico Gaio (born 5 March 1992) is an Italian professional tennis player. He competes mainly on the ATP Challenger Tour and on the ITF circuit. He has won four Challenger titles and nine ITF futures singles titles. He reached his career high ATP singles ranking of World No. 124 in February 2020. In doubles, he has won three Challenger and four ITF futures doubles titles. He reached a career high in doubles of World No. 165 on 9 March 2020 after his maiden ATP doubles final at the 2020 Rio Open partnering Salvatore Caruso.

Professional career

2015: ATP debut
He played his first ATP main draw match in the 2015 Rome Open after gaining entry as a wildcard.

2018: Grand Slam singles debut 
He made his Grand Slam debut at the 2018 US Open as a qualifier where he lost to tenth seed David Goffin.

2020: Maiden doubles ATP final
He reached his first doubles final at the ATP 500 2020 Rio Open partnering Salvatore Caruso where they lost to Horacio Zeballos/Marcel Granollers

ATP Tour finals

Doubles: 1 (1 runner-up)

Challenger and Futures finals

Singles: 26 (13–13)

Doubles: 18 (7–11)

References

External links
 
 

Living people
1992 births
Italian male tennis players